The 62nd National Film Awards ceremony was an event during which the Directorate of Film Festivals presents its annual National Film Awards to honour the best films of 2014 in the Indian cinema. The awards were announced on 24 March 2015 and the ceremony was held on 3 May 2015.

Selection process 

The Directorate of Film Festivals invited nominations for the awards by late December 2014 and the acceptable last date for entries was until 20 January 2015. Feature and Non-Feature Films certified by Central Board of Film Certification between 1 January 2014, and 31 December 2014, were eligible for the film award categories. Books, critical studies, reviews or articles on cinema published in Indian newspapers, magazines, and journals between 1 January 2014, and 31 December 2014, were eligible for the best writing on cinema section. Entries of dubbed, revised or copied versions of a film or translation, abridgements, edited or annotated works and reprints were ineligible for the awards.

For the Feature and Non-Feature Films sections, films in any Indian language, shot on 16 mm, 35 mm, a wider film gauge or a digital format, and released in cinemas, on video or digital formats for home viewing were eligible. Films were required to be certified as a feature film, a featurette or a Documentary/Newsreel/Non-Fiction by the Central Board of Film Certification.

Dadasaheb Phalke Award 

Introduced in 1969, the Dadasaheb Phalke Award is the highest award given to recognise the contributions of film personalities towards the development of Indian cinema and for distinguished contributions to the medium, its growth and promotion. Following were the jury members:

 Jury Members

For the year 2014, the award was announced on 23 March 2015 to be presented to actor, film-maker Shashi Kapoor. He has won two National Film Awards including Best Actor for New Delhi Times in 1985 and is also Padma Bhushan recipient of 2011.

Feature films 

Hindi film Haider won the maximum number of awards (5).

Jury 
For the Feature Film section, six committees were formed based on the different geographic regions in India. The two-tier evaluation process included a central committee and five regional committees. The central committee, headed by Bharathiraja, included the heads of each regional committee and five other jury members. At regional level, each committee consisted of one chief and four members. The chief and one non-chief member of each regional committee were selected from outside that geographic region.

Central Jury

Northern Region: 

Eastern Region: 

Western Region: 

Southern Region I: 

Southern Region II:

All India Award 

Following will be the awards given:

Golden Lotus Award 

Official Name: Swarna Kamal

All the awardees are awarded with 'Golden Lotus Award (Swarna Kamal)', a certificate and cash prize.

Silver Lotus Award 

Official Name: Rajat Kamal

All the awardees are awarded with 'Silver Lotus Award (Rajat Kamal)', a certificate and cash prize.

Regional Awards 

The award is given to best film in the regional languages in India.

Best Feature Film in Each of the Language Other Than Those Specified in the Schedule VIII of the Constitution

Non-Feature Films 

Short Films made in any Indian language and certified by the Central Board of Film Certification as a documentary/newsreel/fiction are eligible for non-feature film section.

Jury 
A committee of seven, headed by Kamal Swaroop, was appointed to evaluate the Non-Feature Films entries. The jury members were:

Golden Lotus Award 

Official Name: Swarna Kamal

All the awardees are awarded with 'Golden Lotus Award (Swarna Kamal)', a certificate and cash prize.

Silver Lotus Award 

Official Name: Rajat Kamal

All the awardees are awarded with 'Silver Lotus Award (Rajat Kamal)' and cash prize.

Best Writing on Cinema 

The awards aim at encouraging study and appreciation of cinema as an art form and dissemination of information and critical appreciation of this art-form through publication of books, articles, reviews etc.

Jury 

A committee of three, headed by Madhan, was appointed to evaluate the nominations for the best writing on Indian cinema. The jury members were as follows:

Golden Lotus Award 

All the winners were awarded with Swarna Kamal (Golden Lotus Award), cash prize and a certificate.

Special Mention 

All the award winners are awarded with Certificate of Merit.

See also 
 National Film Awards

References

External links 

Official websites

 62nd National Film Awards: Official Catalogue
 Dooradarshan Recording of the award ceremony
 National Film Awards Archives
 Official Page for Directorate of Film Festivals, India
 62nd National Film Awards: Regulations for submission

National Film Awards (India) ceremonies
2015 Indian film awards